Cyrtopodion kachhense, also known commonly as the Kachh gecko, the warty rock gecko, the ingoldbyi western ground gecko, or Ingoldby's stone gecko, is a species of gecko, a lizard in the family Gekkonidae. The species is endemic to South Asia.

Taxonomy
Originally described as Gymnodactylus kachensis, this species was reassigned to the genus Tenuidactylus, and then later to the genus Cyrtopodion.  The generic names, Gymnodactylus and Tenuidactylus are masculine, but the generic name, Cyrtopodion is neuter. Therefore, the specific name, kachhensis (masculine), had to be changed to kachhense (neuter) to agree in gender with Cyrtopodion.

Subspecies
Two subspecies are recognized as being valid, including the nominotypical subspecies.

Cyrtopodion kachhense ingoldbyi 
Cyrtopodion kachhense kachhense 

Nota bene: A trinomial authority in parentheses indicates that the subspecies was originally described in a genus other than Cyrtopodion.

Etymology
The subspecific name, ingoldbyi, is in honor of Captain Christopher Martin Ingoldby (1887-1927), who was an officer in the British Army Medical Services and collected zoological specimens.

Geographic range
The species, C. kachhense, is found in Pakistan (Sindh, Balochistan), adjacent India (Kachchh, Gujarat), and Iran.

The subspecies, C. k. ingoldbyi, is widely distributed in the Sulaiman Range extending into the Waziristan Hills, along the western border of Punjab, Pakistan.

The type locality of the species is "Ladha" (= Ladha, Dera Ismael Khan District, southeastern North Western Frontier Province, Pakistan).

References

Further reading
Boulenger GA (1885). Catalogue of the Lizards in the British Museum (Natural History). Second Edition. Volume I. Geckonidæ, Eublepharidæ, Uroplatidæ, Pygopodidæ, Agamidæ. London: Trustees of the British Museum (Natural History). (Taylor and Francis, printers). xii + 436 pp. + Plates I-XXXII. (Gymnodactylus kachhensis, pp. 29–30).
Boulenger GA (1890). The Fauna of British India, Including Ceylon and Burma. Reptilia and Batrachia. London: Secretary of State for India in Council. (Taylor and Francis, printers). xviii + 541 pp. (Gymnodactylus kachhensis, p. 63).
Das I (2002). A Photographic Guide to Snakes and other Reptiles of India. Sanibel Island, Florida: Ralph Curtis Books. 144 pp. . (Cyrtopodion kachhense, p. 92).
Ingoldby CM, Procter JB (1923). "Notes on a Collection of Reptilia from Waziristan and the Adjoining Portion of the N. W. Frontier Province". J. Bombay Nat. Hist. Soc. 29 (1): 117–130. (Gymnodactylus ingoldbyi, new species, pp. 121–122).
Khan MS (1998). "Validity, generic redesignation, and taxonomy of Western Rock Gecko Gymnodactylus ingoldbyi Procter, 1923". Russian J. Herpetol. 4 (2): 83–88. [1997].
Smith MA (1935). The Fauna of British India, Including Ceylon and Burma. Reptilia and Amphibia. Vol. II.—Sauria. London: Secretary of State for India in Council. (Taylor and Francis, printers). xiii + 440 pp. + Plate I + 2 maps. (Gymnodactylus kachhensis, pp. 43–44, Figure 15).
Stoliczka F (1872). "Notes on the Reptilian and Amphibian Fauna of Kachh". Proc. Asiatic Soc. Bengal 1872: 71–85. (Gymnodactylus kachhensis, new species, p. 79).

External links

Fauna of Pakistan
Cyrtopodion
Taxa named by Ferdinand Stoliczka
Reptiles described in 1872